The Grand Pic de Belledonne is the highest mountain in the Belledonne massif in the Dauphiné Alps at .

Geography
Situated in the French department of Isère, the Grand Pic of Belledonne dominates the valley of Grésivaudan and partners the Pic Central of Belledonne and the Croix de Belledonne. These three summits dominate the Freydane glacier.

History 
Étienne Favier performed the first ascent dates on 16 August 1859, via the valley of Eau d'Olle and the Lac De Belledonne. He repeated that ascent on 17 August 1873 with his son, Émile Viallet and Auguste Michel.

In 1875, the Société des Touristes du Dauphiné constructed the refuge of Belledonne  (now in ruins) above the "lac de Belledonne".

The corridor separating the Grand Peak from the Central peak is named after the alpinist Auguste Reynier who, in 1891, made the first climb via the Freydane glacier.

In 1944, Gaston Rébuffat was the first to climb the mountain from the north, accompanied by Michel Chevalier.

References

External links 
Géologie des Trois Pics de Belledonne

Mountains of Isère
Mountains of the Alps